Freddye Harper Williams (January 9, 1917 –  2001) was a newspaper columnist, management analyst, and state legislator in Oklahoma. She graduated as the valedictorian from Douglass High School. She served five terms in the Oklahoma House of Representatives. She was a Democrat. She represented the 99th district.

Fresdye Harper was born in Bay Springs, Mississippi to Frederick G. Harper and Mittie Jo Harper. Her family moved to Pine Bluff, Arkansas and then Oklahoma City when she was a child.

She married Calvin Williams. They had two sons and a daughter.

She began her career as a newspaper columnist for the Black Dispatch and then worked for Tinker Air Force Base for some 30 years. She served on Oklahoma City's Board of Education from 1975 to 1980 and then served five terms in the Oklahoma House of Representatives until 1990. She was also involved in numerous civic organizations.

At one point she was fired from her Tinker Air Force base job because of her work at the Black Dispatch newspaper and its owner Roscoe Dunjee who was associated with Communist organizations.

She was inducted into the Oklahoma Afro-American Hall of Fame in 1985. The National Collegiate Honors Council awards a Freddye T. Davy Student Scholarship.

See also
List of first African-American U.S. state legislators

References

1917 births
2001 deaths
People from Bay Springs, Mississippi
Democratic Party members of the Oklahoma House of Representatives
School board members in Oklahoma
Women state legislators in Oklahoma
African-American women journalists
20th-century American journalists
American columnists
20th-century African-American politicians
20th-century American politicians
African-American state legislators in Oklahoma